The modern Qatari art movement emerged in the mid-20th century, as a result of the new-found wealth acquired from oil exports and subsequent modernization of Qatari society. Because of Islam's non-inclusive stance of depictions of sentient beings in visual arts, paintings historically played an insignificant role in the country's culture. Other visual art forms such as calligraphy, architecture and textiles were more highly regarded in the Bedouin tradition.

Development of modern art

The art scene in Qatar witnessed substantial development in the mid-and late 1950s. Initially, arts were overseen by the Ministry of Education, with art exhibitions being hosted in its facilities. In 1972, the government started providing increased funding to aid the development of arts within the country. The father of modern artists in Qatar is Jassim Zaini (1943–2012), whose work explored diversity in techniques and documented the changing society from traditional local life to a global style. The Qatari fine Arts Society was established in 1980 with the objective of promoting the works of Qatari artists. In 1998, the National Council for Culture, Arts and Heritage was established.

Qatar Museums was established in the early 2000s to build and connect all museums and collections in Qatar. Two major museums lead the institution: the Museum of Islamic Art opened in 2008, and the Mathaf: Arab Museum of Modern Art, opened in Education City by Qatar Foundation in 2010.

Prehistoric art

Ancient rock carvings have been discovered in eight separate locations in Qatar: Jebel Jassassiyeh, Jabel Fuwayrit, Freiha, Al Ghariyah, Al Jumail, Simaisma, Al Wakrah and Al Kassar. Most of these sites were discovered by Danish archaeological teams in the 1950s and 1960s. The carvings are classified in a number of categories, including human and animal representation, boat representation, cup-marks, large cavities, geometric designs, tribal marks, and hand- and footprints.

A large number of rock carvings were discovered in Jebel Jassassiyeh, in northeast Qatar, in 1961. Variations in motifs and technique indicate that the carvings were made through various historical periods. Cup-marks are the most common forms of art among the nearly 900 carvings. Other carvings include ships, animals, foot-prints and tribal marks (known as wasum). Different animals are depicted, such as ostriches, turtles and fish. A large number of the carvings illustrate boats, and this is the only site in Qatar where boat depictions have been recorded. The boats are of different sizes and types, and some contain oars while others do not.

Geometrical designs were recorded at Freiha in four places. They measure 11 to 15 cm in width and 11 to 12 cm in height. Danish archaeologist Peter Glob believed that they were carved by an ancient fertility cult. This theory was disputed by Muhammad Abdul Nayeem, who believes that they are simply abstract symbols or tribal marks.

Textiles

Weaving and dyeing

Weaving and dyeing played a substantial role in Bedouin culture. The process of spinning sheep's and camel's wool to produce cloth was laborious. The wool was first disentangled and tied to a bobbin, which would serve as a core and keep the fibers rigid. This was followed by spinning the wool by hand on a spindle known as a noul. They were then placed on a vertical loom constructed from wood whereupon women would use a stick to beat the weft into place.

The resulting cloths were used in rugs, carpets and tents. Tents were usually made up of naturally colored cloth, whereas rugs and carpets used dyed cloth, mainly red and yellow. The dyes were made from desert herbs, with simple geometrical designs being employed. The art lost popularity in the 19th century as dyes and cloth were increasingly imported from other regions in Asia.

Embroidery

A simple form of embroidery practiced by Qatari women was known as kurar. It involved four women, each carrying four threads, who braided the threads on articles of clothing, mainly thawbs or abayas. The braids, varying in color, were sewn vertically. It was similar to heavy chain stitch embroidery. Gold threads, known as zari, were commonly used. They were usually imported from India.

Another type of embroidery involved the designing of caps called gohfiahs. They were made from cotton and were pierced with thorns from palm-trees to allow the women to sew between the holes. This form of embroidery declined in popularity after the country began importing the caps.

Khiyat al madrasa, translated as 'school embroidery', involved the stitching of furnishings by satin stitching. Prior to the stitching process, a shape was drawn onto the fabric by a skilled artist. The most common designs were birds and flowers.

Architecture

Forts

The numerous forts found throughout the Qatari peninsula are a testament to the country's ancient construction methods. Most forts were constructed using mainly limestone, with other constituents such as mud and clay brick also being used. A type of mixture consisting of mud and clay brick known locally as lubnah was sometimes used in the construction of forts, such as in Ar Rakiyat Fort.

Traditional architecture
Most traditional houses in the capital Doha were tightly packed and arranged around a central courtyard. A number of rooms were situated in the courtyard, most often including a majilis, bathroom and store room. The houses were made from limestone quarried from local sources. Walls surrounding the compounds were made up of compressed mud, gravel and small stones. As they were heavily susceptible to natural erosion, they were protected by gypsum plaster. Mangrove poles wrapped in jute rope provided structural support for the windows and doors.

Roofs were typically flat and were supported by mangrove poles. The poles were covered with a layer of split bamboo and a palm mat locally called manghrour. The mangrove poles often extended past the exterior walls for decorative purposes. Doors were made of metal or wood. Colored glass employing geometrical designs was sometimes used in windows.

Several methods were used in traditional architecture to alleviate the harsh climate of the country. Windows were seldom used in order to reduce heat conduction. The badgheer construction method allowed air to be channeled into houses for ventilation purposes. This was accomplished by several methods, including horizontal air gaps in rooms and parapets, and vertical openings in wind towers called hawaya which drew air into the courtyards. Wind towers, however, were not as common in Doha as they were in other parts of the country.

Shortly after Qatar gained independence, many of the districts of old Doha, including Al Najada, Al Asmakh and Old Al Hitmi, faced gradual decline, and as a result much of their historical architecture has been demolished. A number of schemes have been taken to preserve the city's cultural and architectural heritage, such as the Qatar Museums Authority's 'Al Turath al Hai' ('living heritage') initiative.

Modern architecture
Qatar in the past two decades has pinpointed its place in the world map with prominent global landmarks including Education City which showcases architecture from numerous architects including Rem Koolhaas who designed the Qatar National Library during 2018 and the Qatar Foundation headquarters back in 2014.

Among Qatar's notable architects is Japanese architect Arata Isozaki who contributed towards designing countless buildings in Education City, including the Qatar National Convention Center (QNCC), the Liberal Arts and Science Building (LAS) and the Qatar Foundation Ceremonial Court.

Qatar's art initiatives have expanded tremendously in recent years with the opening of massive great projects including the Doha Fire Station which exhibits art at the heart of the city.

Arts and museums have played a pivotal role in improving Qatar's tourism and inviting people to understand Qatar's history and heritage with the openings of the National Museum of Qatar, Mathaf: Arab Museum of Modern Art, Msheireb Museums and the Museum of Islamic Arts.

Her Excellency Sheikha Al-Mayassa bint Hamad bin Khalifa Al-Thani has played a significant role in bringing art to Qatar, particularly with the latest art installations at the Hamad International Airport (HIA) showcasing pieces of work by numerous global artists in collaboration with Qatar Museums Authority.

Under the guidance of the CEO of Qatar Foundation, Sheikha Moza bint Nasser, Education City has become a home for modernistic buildings originating from worldwide architects contributing to the building of schools, universities, offices, and accommodations for the community.

Examples of modern architecture
In Education City:
 Qatar National Convention Center (2011) designed by Arata Isozaki
 Qatar Foundation Ceremonial Court (2007) designed by Arata Isozaki
 Qatar Foundation Headquarters (2014) designed by Rem Koolhaas
 Northwestern University in Qatar (2017) designed by Antoine Predock
 Carnegie Mellon University in Qatar (2008) designed by Ricardo Legorreta and Victor Legorreta
 Virginia Commonwealth University in Qatar (1998) designed by Mimar Consult
 Weill Cornell Medical College in Qatar (2003) designed by Arata Isozaki
 Liberal Arts and Science building (2004) designed by Arata Isozaki
 Georgetown School of Foreign Service in Qatar (2010) designed by Ricardo Legorreta and Victor Legorreta
 Texas A&M University in Qatar (2007) designed by Ricardo Legorreta and Victor Legorreta
 Qatar Academy (1997) designed by Al Seed Consultant and Design Studio
 Awsaj Academy (2011) designed by James Cubitt and Partners
 Qatar Science and Technology Park (2009) designed by Woods Bagot
 Strategic Studies Center (2014), also known as Think Bay designed by Office for Metropolitan Architecture (OMA)
 Qatar National Library (2018) designed by Rem Koolhaas
 Sidra Medical and Research Center (2017) designed by Pelli Clarke Pelli Architects
 Al Shaqab (2019) designed by Leigh & Orange Architects
 Student Center (2012) designed by Ricardo Legorreta and Victor Legorreta
 Qatar Faculty of Islamic Studies (2014) designed by Mangera Yvars Architects
 Mathaf: Arab Museum of Modern Art (2010) designed by Jean-Francois Bodin

Modern visual arts

Historically, paintings were not common in Qatari society. Instead, other art forms such as calligraphy and architecture were preferred. After the oil boom in the mid-20th century, paintings gained popularity. Common themes during this period were related to Islamic and Arabic heritage. Art exhibitions were held under the auspices of the Ministry of Education until 1972. The Ministry of Education integrated art education into the school system and allocated facilities for art workshops.

As an initiative to develop the local artist base, the ministry began offering scholarships to study art abroad. Jassim Zaini became the first Qatari art student to study abroad on a scholarship in 1962 after he enrolled in the University of Baghdad. Several more artists were sent abroad on art scholarships during the 1960s and 1970s, including Wafika Sultan, Hassan Al Mulla and Yousef Ahmad. The latter became the first artist to receive an M.A. in 1981. Yousef Ahmad was the first artist to hold a solo exhibition in 1977. Under its director Nasser Al-Othman, the Culture and Arts Department inaugurated the country's first art gallery in 1977–78.

Yousef Ahmad, Hassan Al Mulla and Muhammad Ali established the country's first art group in 1977, "The Three Friends Group". In 1980, the Qatari Fine Arts Society was established with the objective of promoting the works of Qatari artists. That year, an art workshop was opened for women with the aim of providing them with an opportunity to hone their artistic skills. The Qatari Fine Arts Society held their first exhibition in 1981. In December 1982, the country's first art exhibition for females was held.

Five main art movements emerged in the country by the late 20th century: surrealism, realism, expressionism, abstract art, and calligraphy.

A member of the ruling family, Hassan bin Mohamed bin Ali Al Thani, has been an instrumental figure in developing Qatar's modern art industry since the 1980s. Among his art-related activities was establishing his own museum which doubled as a residency space for Doha-based artists in 1994, and establishing the Mathaf: Arab Museum of Modern Art in 2010 to which he donated his entire art collection, which he had begun assembling in 1986.

When a quartet comprising Saudi Arabia, the UAE, Bahrain and Egypt severed all ties with and imposed a blockade of Qatar on 5 June 2017, Qatari artist Ahmed Al-Maadheed created an illustration known as "Tamim Almajd", which translates to "Tamim the Glorious". A simple black and white sketch of Emir Tamim bin Hamad Al Thani, beneath of which is the text "Tamim Almajd" in the style of Arabic calligraphy, the illustration has become symbolic of Qatari nationalism. The image is now displayed prominently on buildings, in media and in art in Qatar.

Notable artists
 Jassim Zaini,  probably the most important Qatari artist, founding the modern movement
 Faraj Daham, a Qatari artist and founding member of the Qatari Fine Arts Society, his work addresses social and political topics in painting and installation, often using recycled material and raw material
 Yousef Ahmad, a Qatari painter, art collector and author
 Wafika Sultan Al-Essa, one of the first professional Qatari female artists
 Salman Al-Malik, a Qatari artist
 Hassan Al Mulla, a Qatari surrealist painter

See also
Culture of Qatar
Public art in Qatar
Collecting practices of the Al-Thani Family
Rock art in Qatar
Qatari cuisine
Qatari literature

Art galleries in Qatar
Museum of Islamic Art, Doha
Mathaf: Arab Museum of Modern Art

References

Bibliography

 
Art by country